Tecla Scarano (20 August 1894 – 22 December 1978) was an Italian actress and singer. She appeared in more than 30 films between 1937 and 1966.

Life and career
Born in Naples, the daughter of tenor Giovanni Moretti and operetta singer Anna Scarano, she started performing as a child actress at 9 years old and as a singer aged 10 years old.

Partial filmography

 When Naples Sings (1926, Documentary short)
 It Was I! (1937) - Fiammetta's mother
 Gli ultimi giorni di Pompeo (1937)
 The Children Are Watching Us (1944) - La signora Resta
 La figlia del peccato (1949) - Anna Jervolino
 L'acqua li portò via (1949)
 Lo zappatore (1950)
 Bellissima (1951) - Tilde Spernanzoni
 Il tallone di Achille (1952) - Stella Piccola
 Naples Sings (1953) - Donna Concetta
 Soli per le strade (1953)
 Balocchi e profumi (1953)
 The Doctor of the Mad (1954) - La moglie di Felice
 Bread, Love and Jealousy (1954) - Teresinella
 An American in Rome (1954) - Spettatrice alla TV (uncredited)
 The Gold of Naples (1954) - Un amico di Peppino (segment "Pizze a credito")
 Scapricciatiello (1955) - Assunta, Renato's servant
 Crime in the Streets (1956) - Step-Mother
 Te stò aspettanno (1956)
 The Lady Doctor (1957) - Zia Ada Barbalunga
 Primo applauso (1957)
 La trovatella di Pompei (1957) - Donna Nunziata
 Perfide.... ma belle (1959) - Donna Tecla
 Solitudine (1961)
 Yesterday, Today and Tomorrow (1963) - Verace's sister (segment "Adelina")
 Marriage Italian Style (1964) - Rosalia
 Letti sbagliati (1965) - (La suocera / segment "Quel porco di Maurizio")
 Made in Italy (1965) - His Mother (segment "5 'La Famiglia', episode 1")
 Te lo leggo negli occhi (1965) - Filomena
 Marcia nuziale (1966)
 A Question of Honour (1966) - Efisio's mother
 I nostri mariti (1966) - Aunt Bice (segment "Il marito di Olga")
 Shoot Loud, Louder... I Don't Understand (1966) - Zia Rosa Cimmaruta

References

External links

1894 births
1978 deaths
Italian film actresses
Nastro d'Argento winners
20th-century Italian actresses